Uraz may refer to:

People
Yağmur Uraz, Turkish female football player
Uraz Cengiz Türker, Turkish Computer Scientist

Places
Uraz, Lower Silesian Voivodeship, south-west Poland
Uraz, West Pomeranian Voivodeship, north-west Poland

See also